Cordovan leather may refer to:

Leather from Córdoba, Andalusia, Spain
Cuir de Cordoue
Shell cordovan